Adrian R. Lewis is a United States Army veteran, American historian and  the David B. Pittaway Professor and Quincy Institute Fellow at the University of Kansas, where he has been a history professor since 2008.

Education
Lewis earned a Bachelors of Science degree in Political Science from the University of California, Berkeley. He earned his Masters of Arts from the University of Michigan at Ann Arbor in European and Military history. He also earned his Masters of Business Administration from Southern Illinois University Edwardsville.  Edwardsville. Lewis earned his Ph.D. at the University of Chicago in 1995 under historian Michael Geyer. His' dissertation became his first book, Omaha Beach: A Flawed Victory (2001, University of North Carolina Press). The book analyzes the Normandy Invasion and the battle for Omaha Beach. His second  book, The American Culture of War, was published by Routledge, in 2007.  (2nd ed, 2012,  third, 2018.)

Military service 
He is a retired United States Army Officer, who served in the Ninth Infantry Division and the Second Ranger Battalion at Fort Lewis, Washington. Consequently, his areas of expertise include national security, 20th-century warfare, military affairs, Korean War, Vietnam War, World War II, D-Day - Normandy Invasion at Omaha Beach and military operations in Iraq and Afghanistan.

Academic career 

Lewis has taught at the United States Military Academy, the University of California, Berkeley, and the University of North Texas, Denton, where he chaired the Department of History. He has also taught the Strategy and Policy course for the Naval War College. At the University of Kansas, Lewis served as the first Director of the Office of Professional Military Graduate Education, an office he helped create. This office worked extensively with the U.S. Army Command and General Staff College at Fort Leavenworth, creating new advanced degree programs. This included the creation of the Wounded Warriors Program at the University of Kansas. Lewis specializes in 20th-century warfare: World War II, the Korean and Vietnam Wars, and the more recent military operations, including Operation Iraqi Freedom and Operation Enduring Freedom.

Honors 

 University of Kansas, Professorship, David B. Pittaway, 2019
 University of North Texas, Honors Professor, College of Arts and Sciences, 2000-2001

Publications 

 The American Culture of War: A History of American Military Force from World War II to the Global War on Terrorism. 3rd Edition. New York: Routledge, 2018.
 The American Culture of War: A History of American Military Force from World War II to Operation Enduring Freedom, 2nd Edition. New York: Routledge, 2012.
 The American Culture of War: A History of American Military Force from World War II to Operation Iraqi Freedom. New York: Routledge, 2007.
  Omaha Beach: A Flawed Victory. Chapel Hill, N.C.: The University of North Carolina Press, 2001.

See also
 Bibliography of United States military history
 Military career of Dwight D. Eisenhower

References 

Year of birth missing (living people)
American military historians
United States Army officers
University of California, Berkeley alumni
University of Chicago alumni
University of Kansas faculty
Living people
Place of birth missing (living people)
Southern Illinois University Edwardsville alumni
University of Michigan alumni
University of North Texas faculty
21st-century American historians
21st-century American male writers